Grim Tower is collaboration between Imaad Wasif and Stephen McBean "Death Folk" songs written from an exploration into detunings on acoustic guitars.  A full-length album entitled Anarchic Breezes is slated for a 2012 release.  The 10 song album was recorded in Los Angeles, CA at House of Pie & the Committee HQ by Stephen McBean and Rob Campanella and mixed by Mark Nevers in Nashville, TN at Beech House Studios.

References 

 

Canadian folk rock groups
Canadian psychedelic rock music groups